The Angel of the Alps is a 1957 Italian historical melodrama film directed by Carlo Campogalliani and starring Luisella Boni, Alberto Farnese and Gino Sinimberghi.

The film's art direction was by Giancarlo Bartolini Salimbeni.

Cast
 Luisella Boni as Rina
 Alberto Farnese as Massimo
 Gino Sinimberghi as Banchiere Maffei
 Cristina Grado as Laura
 Germana Paolieri as Contessa Bianca di Roverbella
 Nico Pepe as Gaspare
 Mario Ferrari as conte Roverbella
 Isabella Riva as donna Clotilde
 Giulio Falcier as Fabrizio
 Luisa Mattioli as Maddalena
 Vittorio Manfrino
 Alberto Archetti
 Alfredo Beduschi
 Lucetta Prona

References

Bibliography

External links

1957 films
1957 drama films
Italian drama films
1950s Italian-language films
Films directed by Carlo Campogalliani
Films scored by Giovanni Fusco
1950s Italian films